Steven C. Pennings is an American biologist and biochemist currently the John and Rebecca Moores Professor at University of Houston.

References

Year of birth missing (living people)
Living people
University of Houston faculty
21st-century American biochemists
Place of birth missing (living people)